Enrico Barney (born 10 May 1941) is an Argentine athlete. He competed in the men's pole vault at the 1968 Summer Olympics.

References

1941 births
Living people
Athletes (track and field) at the 1968 Summer Olympics
Argentine male pole vaulters
Olympic athletes of Argentina
Athletes (track and field) at the 1967 Pan American Games
Athletes (track and field) at the 1971 Pan American Games
Pan American Games competitors for Argentina
Place of birth missing (living people)